Richard Dean Anderson is an American film and TV actor who has received numerous awards and honours in the course of a career that has spanned over thirty years. He won, or was nominated for, awards for his work in several series. Starring as Angus MacGyver in the action adventure series MacGyver (1985–92), he received nominations at the TV Land Awards. His next series role was Jack O'Neill (1997-2005) in the military science fiction show Stargate SG-1.

Since 1985, Anderson has been nominated for various awards—nine Saturn Awards (winning two), one Gemini Award, and two TV Land Awards.

Awards and nominations

Jules Verne Award

Celebrity Award

Constellation Awards

Gemini Awards

Saturn Awards

TV Land Awards

Military awards 

Anderson was presented with general's stars and granted the title of 'honorary brigadier general' by the United States Air Force, for his positive portrayal of the Air Force, shortly after his fictional character Colonel Jack O'Neil was promoted to general on the show. The show is credited with helping to increase recruitment to the Air Force.

See also 
 List of awards and nominations received by Stargate SG-1

References 

Anderson, Richard Dean